It Came from the Sky is a 1999 American-Canadian made-for-television drama film starring John Ritter, Yasmine Bleeth, Christopher Lloyd and JoBeth Williams.

Plot
Donald Bridges (John Ritter) and his wife Alice (JoBeth Williams) have a young son, Andy (Kevin Zegers), who is emotionally disturbed due to a near-drowning accident. The parents frequently argue with each other about how to raise their son until they have uninvited houseguests when a plane carrying Jarvis Moody (Christopher Lloyd) and Pepper Upper (Yasmine Bleeth) falls from the sky and crashes right onto their roof.

Jarvis and Pepper are a pair of wealthy eccentrics who give Donald and Alice a lesson in how to enjoy life. The stranded couple force the stressed parents to cope with each other and with their son. Then Andy asks through his artwork to be taken to a special school for children with his type of disorder. All of their lives are changed forever in this warm, offbeat fairytale.

Cast

John Ritter as Donald Bridges
JoBeth Williams as Alice Bridges
Kevin Zegers as Andy Bridges
Yasmine Bleeth as Pepper Upper
Christopher Lloyd as Jarvis Moody
Christian Dabe as Young Andy Bridges
Jonathan Ginsberg as Tony (Limo Driver)

Production credits

Jack Bender (Director and Writer)
Jack Bender, Thomas Coleman and John Fremes (Executive producers)
Ronna Slutske (Producer)
Thomas D. Adelman (Co-associate producer)
Marc Forby (Associate producer)
Vicky Herman (Co-producer)

References

External links

 
 

1999 television films
1999 films
1999 comedy-drama films
American comedy television films
American comedy-drama films
Canadian comedy television films
Canadian comedy-drama films
English-language Canadian films
Films directed by Jack Bender
American drama television films
1990s American films
1990s Canadian films